Mitsunari Okamoto (born 5 May 1965) is a Japanese politician from Komeito who represents Tokyo's 12th district in the House of Representatives.

References 

Living people
1965 births
Members of the House of Representatives from Tokyo
21st-century Japanese politicians
Northwestern University alumni
Sōka University alumni
Komeito politicians